Diniktum, inscribed Di-ni-ik-tumKI, was a middle bronze-age town located somewhere in the Diyala Governorate of Iraq. On the Tigris river downstream from Upi and close to the northern border of Elam. It is possibly at or in the vicinity of Tell Muḥammad, which lies in south-eastern part of modern Baghdad. Diniktum mentioned in the Harmal geographical list.

History

It enjoyed independence briefly during the 18th century under the reigns of the Amorite chieftains (ra-bí-an MAR.DÚ) Itur-šarrum, attested on a single seal from Ešnunna, and Sîn-gāmil, son of Sîn-šēmi and a contemporary of Zimri-Lim (ca. 1710–1698 BC short) of Mari and Ḫammu-rapī (ca. 1728–1686 BC short) of Babylon. In an old Babylonian letter from Yarim-Lim I, the king of Yamḫad to the Yašub-Yahad, the king of Dēr, he says:

Yarim-Lim I would defeat the king of Diniktum in battle.

One king of Diniktum named Itur-šarrum ruled Diniktum for around a century before his successor Sîn-gāmil became the new ruler of the kingdom.

Ikūn-pî-Sîn (“The word of Sin is truthful”), the ruler of Nērebtum and possibly Tutub, cities in the sphere of Ešnunna, has a year name: “Year when Ikū(n)-pî-Sîn captured Diniktum." It was absorbed into the kingdom of Ešnunna and consequently embroiled in its conflicts with Elam during the reigns of Ibāl-pî-El II (ca. 1715–1701 BC short) and Ṣillī-Sîn (ca. 1700–1698 BC short). During an Elamite invasion of Mesopotamia the Elamites sacked Eshnunna. This caused many soldiers in the Elamite army that were from Eshnunna to defect. Because of the mass desertion, the Elamite king retreated back to Diniktum. While in Diniktum, the Elamites would sue for peace with Hammurabi. The Elamites were than driven from the city.

The town was still settled in the later bronze-age, as a year name gives ““the year [in which] Kadašman-Ḫarbe, the king, dug the canal of Diniktum.” Kadašman-Ḫarbe was a Kassite king of Babylon of the late 15th century.

Tell Muhammad
Also Tell Mohammed and Tall Muhammad, is an ancient Near East archaeological site currently in the outskirts of Baghdad. It was worked for 8 seasons beginning in 1978 by the Iraqi State Antiquities Organization in 1978, under the direction of Sd. Mu'tasim Rashid Abdur-Ra. The excavations have revealed remains dating to the Isin-Larsa, Old Babylonian, and Kassite periods.

References

See also
Cities of the ancient Near East

Ancient cities of the Middle East
City-states
Former populated places in Iraq